Susan Kent (born December 12, 1974, in St. John's, Newfoundland and Labrador) is a Canadian actress. She is best known for her work as a cast member of CBC Television's This Hour Has 22 Minutes since joining in 2012. Kent had previously been a writer for, and an occasional performer on the program. She is also known for her portrayal of Susan (the foul-mouthed hockey mom) in Trailer Park Boys since Season 11 (2017).

Early life and education 
Kent was born in St. John's, NL, though she was primarily raised in Corner Brook, NL. She studied theatre arts at Memorial University of Newfoundland's Sir Wilfred Grenfell College campus in Corner Brook. She was classmates with the filmmakers Sherry White and Adriana Maggs, and comedian Jonny Harris.

Career 
Kent also previously appeared in the television series Pretty Hard Cases, Hatching, Matching and Dispatching, Three Chords from the Truth and The Kids in the Hall: Death Comes to Town. Kent's film credits include, Young Triffie, Diverted, A Christmas Fury, Hopeless Romantic, Relative Happiness, How to Be Deadly, Making Love in St. Pierre, and Grown Up Movie Star. Kent also starred in the comedy film Spinster with Chelsea Peretti. Kent is also a member of the sketch comedy group Dance Party of Newfoundland. She has also acted on stage in St. John's, with Rising Tide Theatre in Trinity, and with Resource Centre for the Arts Theatre, including performances in Sara Tilley's The (In)complete Herstory of Women in Newfoundland (and Labrador!)  and her own one-woman show, Nan Loves Jerry.

References

External links

1974 births
21st-century Canadian actresses
Actresses from Newfoundland and Labrador
Canadian comedy writers
Canadian film actresses
Canadian sketch comedians
Canadian television actresses
Canadian television personalities
Canadian television writers
Canadian women comedians
Living people
Memorial University of Newfoundland alumni
People from Corner Brook
Writers from St. John's, Newfoundland and Labrador
This Hour Has 22 Minutes
Canadian women television writers
Canadian women television personalities